Popehat may refer to:
 Mitre, the pope's hat
 Popehat (blog), a legal blog